In enzymology, a nitrous oxide reductase also known as nitrogen:acceptor oxidoreductase (N2O-forming) is an enzyme that catalyzes the final step in bacterial denitrification, the reduction of nitrous oxide  to dinitrogen.
 N2O + 2 reduced cytochome c   N2 + H2O + 2 cytochrome c

It plays a critical role in preventing release of a potent greenhouse gas into the atmosphere.

Function 

N2O is an inorganic metabolite of the prokaryotic cell during denitrification. Thus, denitrifiers comprise the principal group of N2O producers, with roles played also by nitrifiers, methanotrophic bacteria, and fungi. Among them, only denitrifying prokaryotes have the ability to convert N2O to N2. Conversion of N2O into N2 is the last step of a complete nitrate denitrification process and is an autonomous form of respiration. N2O is generated in the denitrifying cell by the activity of respiratory NO reductase. Some microbial communities have only capability of N2O reduction to N2 and does not have the other denitrification pathways such communities are known as nitrous oxide reducers. Some denitrifiers do not have complete denitrification with end product N2O

Structure 
Nitrous-oxide reductase is a homodimer that is located in the bacterial periplasm. X-ray structures of the enzymes from Pseudomonas nautica and Paracoccus denitrificans have revealed that each subunit (MW=65 kDa) is organized into two domains. One cupredoxin-like domain contains a binuclear copper protein known as CuA.

The second domain comprises a 7-bladed propeller of β-sheets that contains the catalytic site called CuZ, which is a tetranuclear copper-sulfide cluster. The distance between the CuA and CuZ centers within a single subunit is greater than 30Å, a distance that precludes physiologically relevant rates of intra-subunit electron transfer. However, the two subunits are orientated "head to tail" such that the CuA center in one subunit lies only 10 Å from the CuZ center in the second ensuring that pairs of redox centers in opposite subunits form the catalytically competent unit. The CuA center can undergo a one-electron redox change and hence has a function similar to that in the well-known aa3-type cytochrome c oxidases where it serves to receive an electron from soluble cytochromes c.

Inhibitors 

Acetylene is the most specific inhibitor of nitrous-oxide reductase. Other inhibitors include azide anion, thiocyanate, carbon monoxide, iodide, and cyanide.

References

EC 1.7.2
Copper enzymes
Enzymes of known structure